Radiological hazard may refer to:
Ionizing radiation#Health effects
Radioactive contamination 
Radiation damage
Radiation poisoning 
Depleted uranium#Radiological hazards

See also
International Nuclear Event Scale